Tamsin Blanchard is a British fashion journalist, author, and lecturer. She is particularly known for her work on sustainability and ecological issues in fashion.

Early life and education
Blanchard was born in Liverpool and took a fashion journalism course at Central Saint Martins.

Journalism
In 1998 Blanchard started up a biannual fashion and visual arts magazine titled IT, for which she was publisher and co-editor. She was also at The Independent as a fashion editor, and from 1999 to 2005 was Style Editor at The Observer. She then joined The Daily Telegraph as style director for their magazine.

The Fashion Museum, Bath, chose Blanchard as the fashion journalist to select the most defining looks of 1996 for their Dress of the Year collection. She picked out an Alexander McQueen tunic and 'bumster' trousers from his "Hunger" collection for the womenswear look, and a man's Paul Smith electric blue two-piece suit and shirt. At the press launch, the clothes were modelled by Jimmy Pursey and his then partner Tizer Bailey, the model who had originally worn the McQueen ensemble in the designer's catwalk presentation. Blanchard said at the time that McQueen, who had recently succeeded John Galliano as the designer for Givenchy, was one of the strongest representations of mid-nineties "cutting-edge style," whilst Smith's suit represented the revolution in menswear where the male consumer was increasingly aware of labels and design.

Blanchard is also a fashion correspondent for the Victoria and Albert Museum's magazine and a contributing editor to 10 Magazine. She has also contributed to Vogue, Marie Claire, Harper's Bazaar and Rubbish.

Blanchard has been invited to teach fashion journalism at the University of Westminster and Central Saint Martins.

Author
Blanchard's best-known book is probably Green is the New Black: How to Change the World with Style, published in 2007 and dealing with ecological awareness in a fashion-conscious lifestyle. TreeHugger reviewed the book favourably, noting that while Blanchard was not as authoritative on eco-issues as Lucy Siegle, she had still written a well-informed, fair-handed book that wrote accessibly about how to be both fashion-conscious and environmentally aware, and the EcoSalon website listed it as among their top 15 books on eco-fashion. The book established Blanchard as an authority on the subject of eco-consciousness in fashion, leading to her being approached for commentary on the topic.

Selected bibliography

Personal life
Blanchard lives in London with her partner and their children.

References

External links
 Official website
 Tamsin Blanchard on Twitter

Living people
Date of birth missing (living people)
Journalists from Liverpool
British women journalists
English fashion journalists
Alumni of Central Saint Martins
Sustainability advocates
Year of birth missing (living people)